Vogogna is a comune (municipality) at the heart of the Val d’Ossola in the Province of Verbano Cusio Ossola, Piedmont, Italy, about  north-west of Verbania. Outlying settlements (frazioni) within the municipality include Prata, Dresio and Genestredo.

The surrounding municipalities are Beura-Cardezza, Pallanzeno, Piedimulera, Pieve Vergonte and Premosello-Chiovenda.

Main sights

The Vogogna Castle, in via Castello, was built in 1344 for the bishop of Novara, Giovanni Visconti, and extended in 1449. Above the castle are the remains of the old rocca which dates from the ninth or tenth century.

The Palazzo Pretorio, or broletto, was constructed in 1348, also at the behest of Giovanni Visconti.

The Sacro Cuore di Gesú is the parish church which was erected between 1894 and 1904 in a neo-gothic style.

San Pietro, in the frazione Dresio, is a church of ancient origins and contains two noted fifteenth-century frescoes; it has been suggested that the figure representing a Servite saint has recently been identified as Pellegrino Laziosi, the most prominent saint of that order.

Twin towns — sister cities
Vogogna is twinned with:

  Lançon-Provence, France

References

External links
  Official website 

Cities and towns in Piedmont